Alex Schoenmaker (born 23 August 1947) is a Dutch former professional football player and manager. Nicknamed Sexy-Lexie due to his good looks, he had a career as a player and manager in the Netherlands, the United States and the Middle East, mostly remembered as an icon of ADO Den Haag.

Playing career
Schoenmaker was born in The Hague. His first club was amateur club VDS in his hometown. He began his professional career with ADO in 1965 and in 1967 appeared for the exported ADO team in the United States called the San Francisco Golden Gate Gales. He left for Feyenoord in the 1971–72 season, where he stayed for four years. For the Rotterdam-based club he scored 19 goals in European competitions – a record that still stands today. In 1974, Schoenmaker became European top goalscorer with 10 goals. After his tenure with Feyenoord, he retired from football as part of his first club ADO, which had meanwhile changed to FC Den Haag, and he played in the Zuiderpark until 1982. In the 1975–76 season, he was the European top goalscorer for the second time in his career, this time with six goals, sharing the honour with Aad Mansveld. Besides San Francisco Golden Gate Gales, Schoenmaker played in the USA and NASL leagues for the Edmonton Drillers and the Fort Lauderdale Strikers.

Managerial career
After his playing career, he worked mostly as an assistant coach – among others with AZ'67, Volendam and Feyenoord. He was also head coach of TOP Oss, ADO Den Haag, Saudi club Al Hilal and Al Jazira Club from Abu Dhabi.

References

External links

1947 births
Living people
Association football forwards
Dutch footballers
Dutch expatriate footballers
Dutch football managers
ADO Den Haag players
Edmonton Drillers (1979–1982) players
Fort Lauderdale Strikers (1977–1983) players
Feyenoord players
FC Volendam managers
ADO Den Haag managers
FC Dordrecht managers
TOP Oss managers
Eredivisie players
Eredivisie managers
North American Soccer League (1968–1984) players
San Francisco Golden Gate Gales players
Footballers from The Hague
United Soccer Association players
Expatriate soccer players in Canada
Dutch expatriate sportspeople in Canada
Expatriate soccer players in the United States
Dutch expatriate sportspeople in the United States
UEFA Cup winning players
Dutch expatriate football managers
FC Volendam non-playing staff
AZ Alkmaar non-playing staff
Feyenoord non-playing staff